Antone James "Andy" Pilney (January 19, 1913 – September 15, 1996) was an American football coach and player of football and baseball. He played football and baseball at the University of Notre Dame in the mid-1930s and then professional baseball from 1936 to 1939. Pilney had a three-game stint in Major League Baseball with the Boston Bees in July 1936. He served as the head football coach at Tulane University from 1954 to 1961, compiling a record of 25–49–6.

College playing career
Pilney played football as a halfback at Notre Dame. In 1935, he led the Irish to a come-from-behind win against top-ranked Ohio State in a contest considered to be a "Game of the Century". Pilney was selected by the Detroit Lions in the third round (26th overall pick) of the 1936 NFL Draft.

Professional baseball career
While he spent most of the season with the minor league Syracuse Chiefs, he played three games with the Boston Bees in July. He appeared twice as a pinch hitter and once as a pinch runner, but did not play the field. He continued to play in the minors until .

Coaching career
Pilney began his college football coaching career in 1942 when he was hired as backfield coach at Washington University in St. Louis.

His final game at Tulane on November 25, 1961 resulted in a 62–0 loss to rival LSU at Baton Rouge, Louisiana. Pilney's successor, Tommy O'Boyle, also lost his final game at the helm of the Green Wave in 1965 to LSU by the same score, 62–0 in Baton Rouge.

Life after coaching
Following his departure from Tulane, Pilney continued to live in the New Orleans area, in the Jefferson Parish suburb of Metairie. He served three terms on the Jefferson Parish Council representing District 4 from 1964 to 1976.

Head coaching record

References

External links

1913 births
1996 deaths
American football halfbacks
Baseball outfielders
Boston Bees players
Columbia Senators players
Erie Sailors players
Georgia Pre-Flight Skycrackers football coaches
Hartford Bees players
Indianapolis Indians players
Notre Dame Fighting Irish baseball players
Notre Dame Fighting Irish football players
Scranton Miners players
Syracuse Chiefs players
Tulane Green Wave football coaches
Washington University Bears football coaches
High school football coaches in Illinois
Louisiana city council members
Sportspeople from Chicago
People from Frontenac, Kansas
People from Metairie, Louisiana
Players of American football from Chicago
Baseball players from Chicago